Yaqub Mor Anthonios (born 12 July 1952) is a Syriac Orthodox bishop and Metropolitan of the Manglore Diocese.

Early years

Mor Anthonios Yaqub was born on 12 July 1952 as the fourth son of K.C John and his wife Eliyamma John, Plamthottathil House, in the small village of Kalamboor near Piravom in Ernakulam District, Kerala. His father (ancestors family) was member of St. George's Jacobite Syrian Church, Kalamboor (Kandanad Diocese). His mother was from the Maliekal family, Pravom (sister of Maliekal Vaidyan) - were members of St. Mary's Valiyapally Piravom ( Kandanad Diocese). His mother was the granddaughter of the sister of Saint Paulose Mor Koorilos (Panampady Thiumeni) and also close relatives of Thomas Mor Osthatheos, (Pachilakkattu) Metropolitan. In 1959, his parents along with the relatives migrated to Kullanki Village in Kundapur Taluk, Udupi, Karnataka. His family took the initiative to build a new church at Athyady along with the other seven  Jaconbite families, which has turned up to 100 families.
 
Yaqu'b Mor Anthonios had his primary Education at the Baindur Govt. School and Honnavar Mission School and Pre-University from Buttercartas College Kundapur. During 1975-1979 he completed his Seminary Course from the Malecruz Dayro, Puthencruz, Kerala and Syriac studies under Joseph Sir, Paulose Mor Athanasius Metropolitan (Kadavil Thirumeni II),Yakob Mor Themothios Metropolitan (Thrikkothamangalam), R. V Markose, and Skariya Cor-Episcopa.

Priesthood

On 3 February  1977 Thomas Mor Osthatheos Metropolitan (his maternal uncle) ordained young Jacob a Korooyo at Malecruz Dayro Church, and he was ordained as ‘Samsono’ (full deacon) on 23 February 1979 by Catholicose Aboon Mor Baselios Paulose II, at Moovattupuzha Catholicate Cathedral. On 11 May 1979, the Catholicose Aboon ordained him a Kassisso (priest), at the St. Mary's Jacobite Syriuan Church, Athyady, Karnataka. In the meanwhile he acquired M.A Sociology from Mysore University. He got ordained as Cor-Episcopo on 18 February 2003 by Geevargese Mor Polycarpus  Metropolitan, at the St. Mary's Soonoro Jacobite Syrian Church, Renjilady and was since then known as Very Rev. P. J. Jacob Cor Episcopa.
 
Yaqu'b Mor Anthonios served as the Manager of St. Antony's Mission &  Educational Society from 1996 to 1999 and from 2002.  He is also serving as manager of St. George's PUC College, Nellyady, St. Antony's, Udane, Jeppu St. Antony's, Honnavar Higher Elementary School, Davengere Higher Primary school and the Director of St. Antony's Orphanage, Honnavar, Brahmavar, Melegre's church, Snehalaya old-age Home, Brahmavar Afa-Omega Retreat Centre. He was Managing Committee member of the Evangelistic Association of the East for a long time.
 
He served as vicar in  the St. Peter's & Paul's  Church in Shirady, St. Mary's Soonoro Church in Renjilady, St. Thomas  Church in Nelliady, St. George's Church in Shibaje, St. Simmon's Church in  Ichilampady, St.Mary’s Church in Kunthoor, Karnataka  under the Evangelistic Association of the East and St. Antony's Church in Jeppu, Mangalore, St. Milagre's Church in Brahmavar, St. George's Church in Madhyody, St. Antony's Church in Honnavar and St. Mary's Church in Athyady under Honnavar Mission.
 
On 20 August 2009, Jacob Cor Episcopa  was ordained a Raban (monk) by Mor Philoxinos Mattiyas Nayis, the Patriarchal Assistant, assisted by Mor Dionnasios Behanam Jajavi, Joseph Mor Gregorios (Metropolitan of Diocese of Kochi and secretary to the Holy Episcopal Synod in Malankara) and Mor Yulios Kuriakose (Metropolitan of Simhasana Churches &and institutions in Malankara). Final consummation service of ordination was blessed by the Patriarch.
 
On 23 August 2009 in a ceremony held at the St. Peter's & St. Paul's Cathedral in the Monastery of St. Aphrem the Syrian, Ma`rrat Sayyidnaya, Damascus, Ignatius Zakka I Iwas, the supreme head of the Universal Syrian Orthodox Church, ordained Yaq'ub Ramban from India Auxiliary Metropolitan, by name Mor Anthonios Yaqu'b, for the St. Antony's Mission in Honnavar under the Evangelical Association of the East, in the presence of many religious dignitaries and others.

Current responsibilities
Yaqu'b Mor Anthonios on ordination was given the responsibility of St. Antony's Mission, Honnavar. Since the formation of Mangalore diocese in 2011 as per the decision of the Malankara Synod, he held full charge of the new diocese.

References

External links
 Mor Yaqub Anthonios
 Honavar Mission

1952 births
Living people
Syriac Orthodox Church bishops
Indian Oriental Orthodox Christians
People from Ernakulam district